Haytham Kamal may refer to:

 Haytham Tambal (born 1978), Sudanese football striker
 Haytham Kamal (basketball) (born 1987), Egyptian basketball player